Gary Keating is a former Canadian politician, who was elected to the Legislative Assembly of New Brunswick in the 2014 provincial election. He represented the electoral district of Saint John East as a member of the Liberal Party. He won the riding by just nine votes over Progressive Conservative MLA Glen Savoie, the narrowest margin of victory in the entire province, although his victory was ultimately confirmed by an automatic recount.

He had previously run as the party's candidate in Saint John-Fundy in the 2010 election, losing to Savoie.

Just three weeks after the election, Keating resigned his seat on October 14, 2014, announcing that after some personal reflection he had decided that public political life was "not for him" as it would entail too much time away from his family, and apologizing to the voters of Saint John East. Savoie won the resulting by-election.

Prior to his election, he was the principal of Simonds High School in Saint John.

Electoral record

References

Living people
Politicians from Saint John, New Brunswick
New Brunswick Liberal Association MLAs
Canadian schoolteachers
21st-century Canadian politicians
Year of birth missing (living people)